Elijah Hampton Tanner (October 31, 1927 – December 6, 2004) was an American football offensive tackle who played two seasons in the National Football League with the San Francisco 49ers and Dallas Texans. He was drafted by the New York Giants in the 30th round of the 1950 NFL Draft. He played college football at the University of Georgia and attended Lanier High School in Macon, Georgia.

References

External links
Just Sports Stats

1927 births
2004 deaths
Players of American football from Georgia (U.S. state)
American football offensive tackles
Georgia Bulldogs football players
San Francisco 49ers players
Dallas Texans (NFL) players
People from Coffee County, Georgia